Goldasht (Former name:Gol-e Kharg) (also known as Gol-e Kharak) is a village in Alamarvdasht Rural District, Alamarvdasht District, Lamerd County, Fars Province, Iran. At the 2006 census, its population was 326, in 75 families. In summer 2015 the name of this village officially changed to Goldasht by the Cabinet of Iran.

References 

Populated places in Lamerd County